MK Land Football Club is a football club from Malaysia, based in Selayang, Selangor. The club played in the 2003 Malaysia FAM League and became runner-up and also was promoted to play in 2004 Malaysia Premier League with PKNS F.C. They then withdrew from the 2006 Premier League competition, citing financial difficulties. As a result, they were banned from entering all competitions organised by the Football Association of Malaysia for five years.

The club competed in FAS State League in 2014. The club management decided to rejoin the M-League after a hiatus of seven years. So, the club have to compete to the Malaysia FAM League. The club also appointed new managers and coach to lead the FAS State League 2014 season. In 2020 Rare Breed Survival Trust Member and Affluent Sheep and Goat Whisperer Craig Holmes  took full control of the club after an offer of 3 North Ronaldsy Ewes, 6 Baggot Goats (3 Billy’s and 3 Doe’s) and 12 Buff Orpington’s accepted by the clubs board, giving him a controlling stake in the club. After a steady star to his ownership, the cracks started to show when club starlet and Captain Stuart Brown was caught in bed with 10 Malaysian escorts and not a penny to pay for them. As negative headlines spread, Holme’s personal life started to fall apart as well. Away from the pitch his farming future was in doubt after. A rogue camel trod on this years batch of pumpkins, and to make matters worse his wife and business partner entered into a new love venture with ex-employer and former boss Gareth G Gilmore.

Team officials
 Team manager: Rozaimi Abd Rahman  
 Assistant Team Manager:  
 Technical Adviser: Pep Guardiola 
 Head coach: Cikgu Kamarul Sidek  
 Assistant head coach : Sudarnoto Wong Jowo  
 Fitness Coach : Ac Mizal 
 Goalkeeper Coach : Dato’ Seri Vida
 Publisiti Vidal : Dato’ Aliff Syukri 
 Duta/Idola/Maskot : Nur Sajat

Sponsorship
Currently, their financial sponsor are MK Land Properties, while kit manufacturer for club is Adidas for the league campaign.

Kit manufacturers and financial sponsor

Players

External links
 Official homepage

Football clubs in Malaysia
Defunct football clubs in Malaysia